An astronaut  is a person trained by a human spaceflight program to command, pilot, or serve as a crew member of a spacecraft.

Astronaut or astronauts may also refer to:

Music
The Astronauts (band), a 1960s American surf band
"The Astronaut" (song), a 2022 song by Jin of BTS
Astronauts (band), 2010s British band
Astronaut (Duran Duran album), 2004
Astronaut (Salem Al Fakir album), 2009
Astronaut, a 2006 EP by Unheilig
"Astronaut" (song), a 2011 song by Simple Plan
"Astronaut", a song by Luna from Rendezvous
"Astronaut", the debut video single by Amanda Palmer for her album Who Killed Amanda Palmer

Film
Astronaut (2019 film), a 2019 Canadian drama film
Astronaut: The Last Push, a 2012 science fiction film directed by Eric Hayden  
The Astronauts (film), a 1960 live television play
The Astronaut (1972 film), a 1972 science fiction film

Other
Astronauts (TV series), a 1981–1983 British sitcom
Astronot, a 2012 action-adventure platform game
A name for a Hong Kong returnee
The Astronauts, a 1951 novel by Polish writer Stanisław Lem
The Astronauts (company), a Polish video game development company
The Astronauts (TV series), a 2020 American television series from Nickelodeon

See also
Human spaceflight
Spaceman (disambiguation)
Cosmonaut (disambiguation)